The Severtzov's birch mouse, or dark birch mouse (Sicista severtzovi) is a species of rodent in the family Sminthidae. It is endemic to East-European steppes (E Ukraine and S-W Russia).

References

Sicista
Mammals of Russia
Taxonomy articles created by Polbot
Mammals described in 1935